Galaxy 2 or Galaxy II may refer to:

 Galaxy II, a play-by-mail game published by Brett A. Tondreau
 Samsung Galaxy S II, an Android smartphone
 Super Mario Galaxy 2, a platforming video game developed and published by Nintendo for the Wii
 Galaxy 2, a communications satellite from Intelsat's Galaxy fleet